The 2012–13 DePaul Blue Demons men's basketball team represented DePaul University during the 2012–13 NCAA Division I men's basketball season. The Blue Demons, led by third year head coach Oliver Purnell, played their home games at the Allstate Arena, with two home games at McGrath-Phillips Arena, and were members of the Big East Conference. They finished the season 11–21, 2–16 in Big East play to finish in last place. They lost in the first round of the Big East tournament to Rutgers.

This was DePaul's final season as a member of the original Big East Conference (now known as the American Athletic Conference or The American). The so-called Catholic 7 schools will join together with Butler, Creighton and Xavier to form a new conference that will keep the Big East Conference name but will be an entirely new conference.

Roster

Schedule

|-
!colspan=9| Exhibition

|-
!colspan=9| Regular season

|-
!colspan=9| 2013 Big East men's basketball tournament

References

DePaul Blue Demons men's basketball seasons
DePaul